Quisque is an extinct genus of prehistoric herring that lived during the Upper Miocene subepoch. At least two species are known, Q. gilberti, from what is now Southern California, and Q. bakeri, from what is now Texas.

References

Clupeidae
Miocene fish of North America